A list of films produced in Egypt in 1930. For an A-Z list of films currently on Wikipedia, see :Category:Egyptian films.

External links
 Egyptian films of 1930 at the Internet Movie Database
 Egyptian films of 1930 elCinema.com

Lists of Egyptian films by year
1930 in Egypt
Lists of 1930 films by country or language